A public dispensary provides "outpatient medical treatment and advice to patients, in contrast to the inpatient service provided by hospitals". Examples include:

Australia
Sydney Dispensary, Australia, founded 1826

Canada
Toronto Western Hospital, Canada, founded as a public dispensary in 1895

India

 Guru Nanak Charitable Dispensary, Chakala, Mumbai
 Ramakrishna Mission Ashrama, Kanpur
 Ramakrishna Mission Vidyapith, Purulia

United Kingdom

London
 The Foundery free dispensary in Moorfields, was opened by Methodist preacher John Wesley in 1746
 Finsbury Dispensary, London, founded 1780
 St. Mary's Dispensary for Women, London, founded 1866
 Surrey Dispensary, founded 1777
 Warwick Lane dispensary, London 1688-1725
St. Martin's Lane dispensary
 General Dispensary, Aldersgate Street

Elsewhere in England
 Ardwick and Ancoats Dispensary, Manchester, England. Founded in 1828 and managed under the auspices of the Provident Dispernsary Association from 1875

Elsewhere in the U.K.
 Edinburgh Provident Dispensary for Women and Children, Scotland, founded 1878
 Public Dispensary of Edinburgh, Scotland, founded 1776 (received royal charter in 1818 to become Royal Public Dispensary of Edinburgh)

United States
 Baltimore General Dispensary
Evening Dispensary For Working Women and Girls, Baltimore

Other countries
 Dispensary for Chinese at Macau, founded in 1820 by the Scottish missionary Robert Morrison and John Livingstone, a surgeon with the East India Company

References 

Public dispensaries